Alimony Madness is a 1933 American pre-Code drama film directed by B. Reeves Eason and starring Helen Chandler, Leon Ames, and Edward Earle. The film's sets were designed by the art director Paul Palmentola.

Plot
A man's greedy ex-wife who only married him for his money is receiving excessive sums in alimony from him. When his new wife, who he met when she posed as the co-respondent for his divorce case, confronts him, the other woman ends up dead.

Cast

References

Bibliography
 Michael R. Pitts. Poverty Row Studios, 1929–1940: An Illustrated History of 55 Independent Film Companies, with a Filmography for Each. McFarland & Company, 2005.

External links

1933 films
American drama films
American black-and-white films
1933 drama films
Films directed by B. Reeves Eason
Mayfair Pictures films
1930s English-language films
1930s American films